Julián Andrés Rodas Ramírez (born 2 January 1982 in Pereira) is a Colombian former professional cyclist.

Major results
2009
 3rd Overall Vuelta Ciclista a Costa Rica
1st Stage 7
2012
 1st Overall Vuelta Mexico Telmex
1st Stage 2

References

External links

1982 births
Living people
Colombian male cyclists
People from Pereira, Colombia